Stara Rudnica  is a village in the administrative district of Gmina Cedynia, within Gryfino County, West Pomeranian Voivodeship, in north-western Poland, close to the German border.

For more on the history of the region, see New March.

References

Villages in Gryfino County